A cherry is the fruit of many plants of the genus Prunus, and is a fleshy drupe (stone fruit).

Commercial cherries are obtained from cultivars of several species, such as the sweet Prunus avium and the sour Prunus cerasus. The name 'cherry' also refers to the cherry tree and its wood, and is sometimes applied to almonds and visually similar flowering trees in the genus Prunus, as in "ornamental cherry" or "cherry blossom". Wild cherry may refer to any of the cherry species growing outside cultivation, although Prunus avium is often referred to specifically by the name "wild cherry" in the British Isles.

Botany

True cherries 

Prunus subg. Cerasus contains species that are typically called cherries. They are known as true cherries and distinguished by having a single winter bud per axil, by having the flowers in small corymbs or umbels of several together (occasionally solitary, e.g. P. serrula; some species with short racemes, e.g. P. maacki), and by having smooth fruit with no obvious groove. Examples of true cherries are:
 Prunus apetala (Siebold & Zucc.) Franch. & Sav. – clove cherry
 Prunus avium (L.) L. – sweet cherry, wild cherry, mazzard or gean
 Prunus campanulata Maxim. – Taiwan cherry, Formosan cherry or bell-flowered cherry
 Prunus canescens Bois. – grey-leaf cherry
 Prunus cerasus L. – sour cherry
 Prunus emarginata (Douglas ex Hook.) Walp. – Oregon cherry or bitter cherry
 Prunus fruticosa Pall. – European dwarf cherry, dwarf cherry, Mongolian cherry or steppe cherry
 Prunus incisa Thunb. – Fuji cherry
 Prunus jamasakura Siebold ex Koidz. – Japanese mountain cherry or Japanese hill cherry
 Prunus leveilleana (Koidz.) Koehne – Korean mountain cherry
 Prunus maackii Rupr. – Manchurian cherry or Amur chokecherry
 Prunus mahaleb L. – Saint Lucie cherry, rock cherry, perfumed cherry or mahaleb cherry
 Prunus maximowiczii Rupr. – Miyama cherry or Korean cherry
 Prunus nipponica Matsum. – Takane cherry, peak cherry or Japanese alpine cherry
 Prunus pensylvanica L.f. – pin cherry, fire cherry, or wild red cherry
 Prunus pseudocerasus Lindl. – Chinese sour cherry or Chinese cherry
 Prunus rufa Wall ex Hook.f. – Himalayan cherry
 Prunus rufoides C.K.Schneid. – tailed-leaf cherry
 Prunus sargentii Rehder – northern Japanese hill cherry, northern Japanese mountain cherry or Sargent's cherry
 Prunus serrula Franch. – paperbark cherry, birch bark cherry or Tibetan cherry
 Prunus serrulata Lindl. – Japanese cherry, hill cherry, Oriental cherry or East Asian cherry
 Prunus speciosa (Koidz.) Ingram – Oshima cherry
 Prunus takesimensis Nakai – Ulleungdo cherry
 Prunus yedoensis Matsum. – Yoshino cherry or Tokyo cherry

Bush cherries 

Bush cherries are characterized by having three winter buds per axil. They used to be included in Prunus subg. Cerasus, but phylogenetic research indicates they should be a section of Prunus subg. Prunus. Examples of bush cherries are:
 Prunus cistena Koehne – purple-leaf sand cherry
 Prunus humilis Bunge – Chinese plum-cherry or humble bush cherry
 Prunus japonica Thunb. – Korean cherry
 Prunus prostrata Labill. – mountain cherry, rock cherry, spreading cherry or prostrate cherry
 Prunus pumila L. – sand cherry
 Prunus tomentosa Thunb. – Nanking cherry, Manchu cherry, downy cherry, Shanghai cherry, Ando cherry, mountain cherry, Chinese dwarf cherry, Chinese bush cherry

Bird cherries, cherry laurels, and other racemose cherries 

Prunus subg. Padus contains most racemose species that are called cherries which used to be included in the genera Padus (bird cherries), Laurocerasus (cherry laurels), Pygeum (tropical species such as African cherry) and Maddenia. Examples of the racemose cherries are:
 Prunus africana (Hook.f.) Kalkman – African cherry
 Prunus caroliniana Aiton – Carolina laurel cherry or laurel cherry
 Prunus cornuta (Wall. ex Royle) Steud. – Himalayan bird cherry
 Prunus grayana Maxim. – Japanese bird cherry or Gray's bird cherry
 Prunus ilicifolia (Nutt. ex Hook. & Arn.) Walp. – hollyleaf cherry, evergreen cherry, holly-leaved cherry or islay
 Prunus laurocerasus L. – cherry laurel
 Prunus lyonii (Eastw.) Sarg. – Catalina Island cherry
 Prunus myrtifolia (L.) Urb. – West Indian cherry
 Prunus napaulensis (Ser.) Steud. – Nepal bird cherry
 Prunus occidentalis Sw. – western cherry laurel
 Prunus padus L. – bird cherry or European bird cherry
 Prunus pleuradenia Griseb. – Antilles cherry
 Prunus serotina Ehrh. – black cherry, wild cherry
 Prunus ssiori F.Schmidt – Hokkaido bird cherry
 Prunus virginiana L. – chokecherry

Etymology and antiquity 

The English word cherry derives from Old Northern French or Norman cherise from the Latin cerasum, referring to an ancient Greek region, Kerasous (Κερασοῦς) near Giresun, Turkey, from which cherries were first thought to be exported to Europe.
The indigenous range of the sweet cherry extends through most of Europe, western Asia, and parts of northern Africa, and the fruit has been consumed throughout its range since prehistoric times. A cultivated cherry is recorded as having been brought to Rome by Lucius Licinius Lucullus from northeastern Anatolia, also known as the Pontus region, in 72 BC.

Cherries were introduced into England at Teynham, near Sittingbourne in Kent, by order of Henry VIII, who had tasted them in Flanders.

Cherries arrived in North America early in the settlement of Brooklyn, New York (then called "New Netherland") when the region was under Dutch sovereignty. Trades people leased or purchased land to plant orchards and produce gardens, "Certificate of Cornelis van Tienhoven that he had found 12 apple, 40 peach, 73 cherry trees, 26 sage plants.., behind the house sold by Anthony Janszoon van Salee to Barent Dirksen... ANNO 18th of June 1639."

Cultivation 

The cultivated forms are of the species sweet cherry (P. avium) to which most cherry cultivars belong, and the sour cherry (P. cerasus), which is used mainly for cooking. Both species originate in Europe and western Asia; they usually do not cross-pollinate. Some other species, although having edible fruit, are not grown extensively for consumption, except in northern regions where the two main species will not grow. Irrigation, spraying, labor, and their propensity to damage from rain and hail make cherries relatively expensive. Nonetheless, demand is high for the fruit. In commercial production, sour cherries, as well as sweet cherries sometimes, are harvested by using a mechanized "shaker". Hand picking is also widely used for sweet as well as sour cherries to harvest the fruit to avoid damage to both fruit and trees.

Common rootstocks include Mazzard, Mahaleb, Colt, and Gisela Series, a dwarfing rootstock that produces trees significantly smaller than others, only 8 to 10 feet (2.5 to 3 meters) tall. Sour cherries require no pollenizer, while few sweet varieties are self-fertile.

A cherry tree will take three to four years once it is planted in the orchard to produce its first crop of fruit, and seven years to attain full maturity.

Growing season 
Like most temperate-latitude trees, cherry trees require a certain number of chilling hours each year to break dormancy and bloom and produce fruit. The number of chilling hours required depends on the variety. Because of this cold-weather requirement, no members of the genus Prunus can grow in tropical climates. (See "production" section for more information on chilling requirements)

Cherries have a short growing season and can grow in most temperate latitudes. Cherries blossom in April (in the Northern Hemisphere) and the peak season for the cherry harvest is in the summer. In southern Europe in June, in North America in June, in England in mid-July, and in southern British Columbia (Canada) in June to mid-August. In many parts of North America, they are among the first tree fruits to flower and ripen in mid-Spring.

In the Southern Hemisphere, cherries are usually at their peak in late December and are widely associated with Christmas. 'Burlat' is an early variety which ripens during the beginning of December, 'Lapins' ripens near the end of December, and 'Sweetheart' finish slightly later.

Pests and diseases 

Generally, the cherry can be a difficult fruit tree to grow and keep alive.  In Europe, the first visible pest in the growing season soon after blossom (in April in western Europe) usually is the black cherry aphid ("cherry blackfly", Myzus cerasi), which causes leaves at the tips of branches to curl, with the blackfly colonies exuding a sticky secretion which promotes fungal growth on the leaves and fruit. At the fruiting stage in June/July (Europe), the cherry fruit fly (Rhagoletis cingulata and Rhagoletis cerasi) lays its eggs in the immature fruit, whereafter its larvae feed on the cherry flesh and exit through a small hole (about 1 mm diameter), which in turn is the entry point for fungal infection of the cherry fruit after rainfall. In addition, cherry trees are susceptible to bacterial canker, cytospora canker, brown rot of the fruit, root rot from overly wet soil, crown rot, and several viruses.

Cultivars 

The following cultivars have gained the Royal Horticultural Society's Award of Garden Merit:

See cherry blossom and Prunus for ornamental trees.

Production 

In 2020, world production of sweet cherries was 2.61 million tonnes, with Turkey producing 28% of this total. Other major producers of sweet cherries were the United States and Chile. World production of sour cherries in 2020 was 1.48 million tonnes, led by Russia, Turkey, Ukraine and Serbia.

Middle East 

Major commercial cherry orchards in West Asia are in Turkey, Iran, Syria, Azerbaijan, Lebanon, and Israel.

Europe 
Major commercial cherry orchards in Europe are in Turkey, Italy, Spain and other Mediterranean regions, and to a smaller extent in the Baltic States and southern Scandinavia.

In France since the 1920s, the first cherries of the season come in April/May from the region of Céret (Pyrénées-Orientales), where the local producers send, as a tradition since 1932, the first crate of cherries to the president of the Republic.

North America 

In the United States, most sweet cherries are grown in Washington, California, Oregon, Wisconsin, and Michigan. Important sweet cherry cultivars include Bing, Ulster, Rainier, Brooks, Tulare, King, and Sweetheart. Both Oregon and Michigan provide light-colored 'Royal Ann' ('Napoleon'; alternately 'Queen Anne') cherries for the maraschino cherry process. Most sour (also called tart) cherries are grown in Michigan, followed by Utah, New York, and Washington. Sour cherries include 'Nanking' and 'Evans'. Traverse City, Michigan is called the "Cherry Capital of the World", hosting a National Cherry Festival and making the world's largest cherry pie. The specific region of northern Michigan known for tart cherry production is referred to as the "Traverse Bay" region.

Most cherry varieties have a chilling requirement of 800 or more hours, meaning that in order to break dormancy, blossom, and set fruit, the winter season needs to have at least 800 hours where the temperature is below . “Low chill” varieties requiring 300 hours or less are Minnie Royal and Royal Lee, requiring cross-pollinization, whereas the cultivar, Royal Crimson, is self-fertile.  These varieties extend the range of cultivation of cherries to the mild winter areas of southern US. This is a boon to California producers of sweet cherries, as California is the second largest producer of sweet cherries in the US.

Native and non-native sweet cherries grow well in Canada's provinces of Ontario and British Columbia where an annual cherry festival has been celebrated for seven consecutive decades in the Okanagan Valley town of Osoyoos. In addition to the Okanagan, other British Columbia cherry growing regions are the Similkameen Valley and Kootenay Valley, all three regions together producing 5.5 million kg annually or 60% of total Canadian output. Sweet cherry varieties in British Columbia include 'Rainier', 'Van', 'Chelan', 'Lapins', 'Sweetheart', 'Skeena', 'Staccato', 'Christalina' and 'Bing'.

Australia 
In Australia, cherries are grown in all the states except for the Northern Territory.  The major producing regions are located in the temperate areas within New South Wales, Victoria, South Australia and Tasmania.  Western Australia has limited production in the elevated parts in the southwest of the state.  Key production areas include Young, Orange and Bathurst in New South Wales, Wandin, the Goulburn and Murray valley areas in Victoria, the Adelaide Hills region in South Australia, and the Huon and Derwent Valleys in Tasmania.

Key commercial varieties in order of seasonality include 'Empress', 'Merchant', 'Supreme', 'Ron's seedling', 'Chelan', 'Ulster', 'Van', 'Bing', 'Stella', 'Nordwunder', 'Lapins', 'Simone', 'Regina', 'Kordia' and 'Sweetheart'.  New varieties are being introduced, including the late season 'Staccato' and early season 'Sequoia'.  The Australian Cherry Breeding program is developing a series of new varieties which are under testing evaluation.

The New South Wales town of Young is called the "Cherry Capital of Australia" and hosts the National Cherry Festival.

Nutritional value 
Raw sweet cherries are 82% water, 16% carbohydrates, 1% protein, and negligible in fat (table). As raw fruit, sweet cherries provide little nutrient content per 100 g serving, as only dietary fiber and vitamin C are present in moderate content, while other vitamins and dietary minerals each supply less than 10% of the Daily Value (DV) per serving, respectively (table).

Compared to sweet cherries, raw sour cherries contain 50% more vitamin C per 100 g (12% DV) and about 20 times more vitamin A (8% DV), beta-Carotene in particular (table).

Health risks 
The cherry kernels, accessible by chewing or breaking the hard-shelled cherry pits, contain amygdalin, a chemical that releases the toxic compound hydrogen cyanide when ingested. The amount of amygdalin in each cherry varies widely, and symptoms would show only after eating several crushed pits (3-4 of the Morello variety or 7-9 of the red or black varieties). Swallowing the pits whole normally causes no complications.

An experiment conducted on the amount of cyanide found in cherries showed that a normal cherry pit contains 0.004 mg of cyanide, which is not a fatal dose for humans, but is best avoided, as different varieties of cherries may contain higher amounts of cyanide.

Other uses 

Cherry wood is valued for its rich color and straight grain in manufacturing fine furniture, particularly desks, tables and chairs.

See also 
 Cherry ice cream
 Cherry juice
 Cherry pit oil
 Cherry pitter
 Dried cherry
 List of Award of Garden Merit flowering cherries
 List of cherry dishes
 Mahleb, a spice made out of cherry seeds (found within cherry pits)

References

External links 
 
 
 

 
Prunus
Fruit trees
Drupes